Ashtabula is a city in Ashtabula County, Ohio, United States, and the center of the Ashtabula micropolitan area. As of the 2020 census, the city had a total population of 17,975. Like many other cities in the Rust Belt, it has lost population due to a decline in industrial jobs since the 1960s.

The city became an important destination on the Underground Railroad in the middle 19th century, as refugee slaves could take ships to Canada and freedom. Even in the free state of Ohio, they were at risk of being captured by slavecatchers. Beginning in the late 19th century, the city became a major coal port on Lake Erie at the mouth of the Ashtabula River northeast of Cleveland. Coal and iron were shipped here, the latter from the Mesabi Range in Minnesota. The city attracted immigrants from Finland, Sweden and Italy in the industrial period. Ashtabula hosts an annual Blessing of the Fleet Celebration, usually in late May or early June. As part of the celebration, a religious procession and prayer service is held at Ashtabula Harbor. The city was the site of the FinnFestUSA in 2007, a celebration of Finnish Americans.

History 

This area had long been inhabited by indigenous peoples. After the American Revolutionary War, the United States mounted the Northwest Indian War to push Native American peoples out of what it then called the Northwest - the area of the Midwest south of the Great Lakes and west of the Appalachian Mountains. The success of this military effort resulted in more European Americans entering Ohio and nearby territories.

The site of Ashtabula was settled by such European Americans beginning in 1803. The city was incorporated in 1891. Located directly on Lake Erie and developed as a port for trade, the city contained several stops on the Underground Railroad. This informal, secret system was the means by which anti-slavery supporters helped escaped African-American slaves reach freedom in Canada in the years before the American Civil War. While Ohio was a free state, many refugee slaves still felt at risk of slavecatchers here, particularly after the Fugitive Slave Law of 1850 was passed. It required enforcement and cooperation by residents of free states to return escaped slaves and was biased toward slavecatchers, requiring little documentation of their claims. Among the Underground Railroad sites in Ashtabula is Hubbard House, one of the handful of former surviving termination points. Refugee slaves stayed in a basement of the house adjacent to the lake and then left on the next safe boat to Canada, gaining their freedom once they arrived in Ontario.

The city's harbor has been important as a large ore and coal port since the end of the 19th century, and integral to the steel manufacturing that was developed around the Great Lakes. Lake steamers and barges, built at shipyards along the Great Lakes and setting new records for size and tonnage, delivered cargoes of iron ore from the Mesabi Range in Minnesota. This continues as a coal port; a long coal ramp is visible in the harbor. Ore shipments are unloaded from 'lakers' (Great Lakes freighters) and shipped to surviving steel mills in Pennsylvania. Industrial jobs have declined since the late 20th century with much steel manufacturing moved offshore.

An electric street railroad was built by Captain John N. Stuart in 1883. However, in July 1890, the city council dispossessed him of the street railroad and associated franchises via a disputable court decision. Shortly after, 600-700 men started to tear up and remove the tracks under the cover of darkness.

Many European immigrants, particularly from Finland, Sweden, and Italy, were attracted to the industrial jobs in Ashtabula in the late 19th and early 20th centuries, as they could learn and accomplish tasks without having a great command of English. Ethnic rivalries among these groups were once a major influence on politics and daily life in Ashtabula.

In 1915, Ashtabula became the first city in the United States to adopt a form of voting called proportional representation. This was an addition to the council-manager charter, originally passed in 1914, and served as a model for the National Municipal League. Twenty-four more cities would go on to use this single-transferable-vote (STV) system, with five in total in Ohio. Ethnic rivalries were one reason for the city's switch, as STV enabled minorities to win political office. Another factor was disunity in the incumbent Republican Party. Voters repealed the system in 1929, using it for the last time in 1931. Despite two failed repeal campaigns in 1920 and 1926, political bosses and parties that lost power under STV eventually restored plurality voting, otherwise known as 'winner take all.'

A substantial percentage of the current residents are descended from those early 20th-century immigrants. The population in the City of Ashtabula grew steadily until 1970 but has declined in recent years due to industrial restructuring and loss of jobs. Since the late 20th century, the city has become a destination for Hispanic or Latino immigrants, who by the 2010 census made up 9.3% of the population. (See 'Demographics' section below.)

Tragedies

Construction of railroads connected Ashtabula to a national network that contributed to its success as a port. On December 29, 1876, one of the nation's most notorious rail accidents occurred, known as the Ashtabula River railroad disaster, Ashtabula Horror, or Ashtabula bridge disaster. A fire was started by the car stoves, and of the 159 people on board, 92 were killed and 64 were injured.

A rail ferry, also named Ashtabula, used to run from Ashtabula to Port Burwell, Ontario. The ferry was launched in 1906 and operated successfully for many decades. It collided with the steamer SS Ben Morell in September 1959, causing the ferry to sink.

On August 10, 1958, a natural gas leak was ignited by electrical equipment or lighting in Andover, Ohio a neighboring town. The resulting explosion destroyed a restaurant and five other buildings. 21 people were killed, and 15 injured.

Geography
Ashtabula is located at  (41.877138, −80.796976).

Ashtabula is bordered by Lake Erie to the north and has a prominent harbor where the Ashtabula River flows into the lake. The Ashtabula Harbor was a primary coal harbor and still serves to ship. It has two public beaches: Walnut Beach, near the harbor, and Lake Shore Park, originally a Public Works Administration project during the Great Depression, on the opposite side of the harbor.

Part of the city lies in Ashtabula Township, and part lies in Saybrook Township.

The Ashtabula area receives a considerable amount of snow throughout the winter, with the average snowfall being . Much of the snow comes from lake-effect snow bands from the Great Lakes.

Demographics

2010 census
At the 2010 census there were 19,124 people in 7,746 households, including 4,724 families, in the city. The racial makeup of the city was 82.0% White, 8.9% African American, 0.4% Native American, 0.3% Asian, 3.3% from other races, and 5.0% from two or more races. Hispanic or Latino of any race were 9.3%.

Of the 7,746 households, 33.0% had children under the age of 18 living with them, 35.2% were married couples living together, 19.3% had a female householder with no husband present, 6.5% had a male householder with no wife present, and 39.0% were non-families. 32.9% of households were one person, and 13.3% were one person aged 65 or older. The average household size was 2.42 and the average family size was 3.03.

The median age was 37 years. 26.4% of residents were under the age of 18; 9.3% were between the ages of 18 and 24; 23.9% were from 25 to 44; 25.8% were from 45 to 64; and 14.7% were 65 or older. The gender makeup of the city was 47.6% male and 52.4% female.

2000 census
At the 2000 census, there were 20,962 people in 8,435 households, including 5,423 families, in the city. The population density was 2,775.9 people per square mile (1,072.0/km2). There were 9,151 housing units at an average density of 1,211.8 per square mile (468.0/km2). The racial makeup of the city was 84.69% White, 9.79% African American, 0.29% Native American, 0.40% Asian, 0.05% Pacific Islander, 2.51% from other races, and 2.26% from two or more races. Hispanic or Latino of any race was 5.32% of the population. 16.5% identified as of Italian ancestry, 14.6% as German, 9.2% as American, 8.1% as Irish, and 8.1% as English, according to Census 2000. 93.1% spoke English and 5.4% Spanish as their first language.

Of the 8,435 households, 32.6% had children under the age of 18 living with them, 41.9% were married couples living together, 17.4% had a female householder with no husband present, and 35.7% were non-families. 30.6% of households were one person, and 13.3% were one person aged 65 or older. The average household size was 2.45 and the average family size was 3.03.

In the city the population was spread out, with 27.6% under the age of 18, 8.8% from 18 to 24, 28.1% from 25 to 44, 20.5% from 45 to 64, and 15.0% 65 or older. The median age was 35 years. For every 100 females, there were 88.1 males. For every 100 females age 18 and over, there were 83.3 males.

The median household income was $27,354 and the median family income was $33,454. Males had a median income of $28,436 versus $22,490 for females. The per capita income for the city was $14,034. About 17.8% of families and 21.4% of the population were below the poverty line, including 31.2% of those under age 18 and 13.6% of those age 65 or over.

Port

During the 1950s, the area experienced growth with an expanding chemical industry and increasing harbor activity, making Ashtabula one of the most important port cities of the Great Lakes. Other historical industries in the area included a Rockwell International plant on Route 20 on the western side of Ashtabula, which manufactured brakes for the Space Shuttle program, and the extrusion of depleted and enriched uranium at the Reactive Metals Extrusion plant on East 21st Street.

Due to such industrial uses, however, there was extensive environmental contamination. The Ashtabula River and harbor were designated as a significant Superfund site by the Environmental Protection Agency in the late 20th century. A multi-year process of environmental cleanup of toxic wastes and soils was needed; cleanup concluded with river dredging in 2012–2014.

Ashtabula Harbor hosts an annual 'Blessing of the Fleet' community festival. This Blessing of the Fleet began as a practice of priests for Catholic Portuguese and Irish fishermen and tugmen who had settled in Ashtabula. During the 1930s, the Blessing was a small, almost private affair in early April conducted by a few tugmen, their parish priest, and an acolyte, according to their traditions. It took place annually when the Great Lakes were free enough of ice to be open for regular traffic. By 1950, this event was held as a public ceremony under the auspices of Mother of Sorrows parish. In 1974, the Blessing of the Fleet became a community affair, with all of Ashtabula's religious and harbor community participating.

The United States Coast Guard Station and the Ashtabula Maritime & Surface Transportation Museum, located in the old lighthouse keepers home, help to preserve Ashtabula's maritime heritage.

Norfolk Southern used the port for one its coal piers. The coal pier became idled in 2016 due to declining demand for coal.

Education
The Ashtabula Area School District serves Ashtabula (its high school is Lakeside High School). Kent State University at Ashtabula is located in the city, providing a local campus of this institution. As for private schools, Ashtabula or Saybrook is home to Saint John School, a K–12 school under the Diocese of Youngstown which has incorporated Ashtabula's previous parish schools and independent Catholic high school as one institution.

Ashtabula has two public libraries: the Harbor Topky Memorial Library, and a branch of the Ashtabula County District Library.

Medical care

Ashtabula County Medical Center (ACMC) is a multi-specialty hospital located in Ashtabula County, Ohio. ACMC serves the people of the county and the surrounding areas in northeastern Ohio. it is an affiliate of the Cleveland Clinic system.

The hospital operates the county's only behavioral medicine unit, and a sleep disorders lab, as well as many specialized services. The attached "Ashtabula Clinic" provides outpatient care in the specialties of pediatrics, internal medicine, family medicine, pulmonary, neurology, psychiatry, sleep disorders, cardiology, gastroenterology, ophthalmology, general surgery, orthopedics, urology, ENT, podiatry and oncology. ACMC operates satellite clinics in the county of Ashtabula. In December 2008, ACMC added the first Cardiac Catheterization Lab (commonly known as the Cath Lab) in Ashtabula County. ACMC provides OB/GYN care and maternity/birthing services in a newly renovated maternity unit.

Notable people 
Edwin Cowles, newspaperman
Isaac Arthur, board of elections chairman and science communicator
Jarrod Bunch, National Football League player
Charles E. Burchfield, watercolor painter
Edwin Cowles, newspaperman
William R. Daley, former owner of MLB's Cleveland Indians
Charles DeBarber, a cyber intelligence analyst on CBS's Hunted (2017 TV series)
Danica Dillon, pornographic actress whose debut was in 2009. 
Edward Mason Eggleston, painter and commercial illustrator
Wallace Wilson Graham. Wisconsin legislator and lawyer
Robert Lighthizer, 18th United States Trade Representative
Jesse Fuller McDonald, 16th Governor of Colorado
Urban Meyer, head football coach at the University of Florida and Ohio State University, former head coach of the Jacksonville Jaguars
Danielle Nicolet, actress
Don Novello, actor and comedian
Maila Nurmi, Hollywood actress
Charles F. Osborn, Wisconsin politician, lawyer and jurist
Babe Parnell, National Football League player
Karl A. Peckol, lost in the sinking of the Edmund Fitzgerald
Paul M. Rippa, lost in the sinking of the Edmund Fitzgerald
Connie Schultz, Pulitzer Prize-winning author
Louis C. Shepard, Civil War Medal of Honor recipient
T-Bone Slim, author and activist
Freddie Smith, Daytime Emmy Award-winning actor
John Spano, former owner of the New York Islanders
Andrew Tombes, Hollywood actor
Decius Wade, prominent Montana lawyer
Mark Wagner, Major League Baseball player

In popular culture
During World War II, the United States Navy used the names of rivers with Indian origins for an entire class of fleet oilers, which are used to replenish vessels while underway at sea. USS Ashtabula (AO-51) was commissioned in 1943 and served until 1982. Ashtabula was awarded eight battle stars for World War II service, four battle stars for the Korean War, and eight battle stars for duty in the Vietnam War. Partially scrapped in 1995, Ashtabula was expended as a target in fleet exercises on October 15, 2000. She has been the only Navy vessel to bear the name Ashtabula.

In literature, Carl Sandburg wrote a poem titled "Crossing Ohio when Poppies Bloom in Ashtabula." Jack Kerouac's On the Road mentions Ashtabula. The main character, Sal Paradise, drives by Ashtabula in a bus during his cross-country trip. Vern Sneider's 1960 novel, The King from Ashtabula, makes reference to the city. The city is mentioned in the 1973 novel Breakfast of Champions, by Kurt Vonnegut, where the character Kilgore Trout buys sunglasses at a Holiday Inn there.

In music, Bob Dylan's "You're Gonna Make Me Lonesome When You Go" on his album Blood on the Tracks refers to Ashtabula, along with Honolulu and San Francisco. Robert (Bob) McGuire's song "Moon over Parma" mentions Ashtabula (the place where the song's narrator met the girl of his affections) in its lyrics. This song was used as the Season 1 opening theme for the 1990s sitcom The Drew Carey Show. "Ashtabula," a song by the Canadian singer-songwriter David Francey, describes a visit to the city.

In television, in Sabrina the Teenage Witch season 3 episode 8, Zelda mentioned owning a driveway in Ashtabula. F is for Family, a Netflix adult animated comedy, depicts a billboard advertising Mohican Airway's "11 Nonstop Daily Flights to Ashtabula" during the Season 4 episode "Murphy & Son."

In film, the 1946 Abbott and Costello film Little Giant names a stubborn mule Ashtabula. The 1990 made-for-television movie, Always Remember I Love You, starring Patty Duke and Stephen Dorff, is set in Ashtabula.

Gallery

See also
 Ashtabula River railroad disaster
 Ashtabula lift bridge
 Ashtabula Harbour Commercial District
 List of people from Ashtabula, Ohio

References

External links

 
 City website
 Chamber of commerce
 School district
 Public library

 
Cities in Ashtabula County, Ohio
Populated places on the Underground Railroad
Ohio populated places on Lake Erie
Finnish-American culture in Ohio
Populated places established in 1803
1803 establishments in Ohio
Cities in Ohio